El Exigente: The Demanding One is an album by American jazz drummer/composer/bandleader Chico Hamilton released by the Flying Dutchman label in 1970.

Reception

AllMusic awarded the album 3 stars.

Track listing
All compositions by Chico Hamilton except where noted
 Maybe Tomorrow, Never (A Suite):
 "As I Open My Eyes" − 6:28
 "Take Me There" − 2:25
 "I Came and Saw the Beauty of Your Love" (Hamilton, Steve Swallow) − 3:32
 "How 'Bout Bobby?" (Bob Mann, Hamilton) − 2:25
 "Stomp, Stomp, Stomp" (Arnie Lawrence, Hamilton) − 2:22
 "Swingin' on a Sitar" (Lawrence) − 1:33
 Maybe Tomorrow, Never (A Suite): − 14:28
 "Up Front What Counts" 
 "On the Trail (From "Grand Canyon Suite")" (Ferde Grofe)
 "Seat Belt" (Mann, Hamilton)
 "Volvo's" (Lawrence, Hamilton)
 "Gonna Get Some Right Now" (Lawrence)

Personnel
Chico Hamilton − drums
Arnie Lawrence − alto saxophone 
Bob Mann − guitar
Steve Swallow − bass

References

Chico Hamilton albums
1970 albums
Flying Dutchman Records albums
Albums produced by Bob Thiele